Williams Bridge station (also known as Williams Bridge–East 210th Street station) is a commuter rail stop on the Metro-North Railroad's Harlem Line, serving the Williamsbridge and Norwood sections of the Bronx, New York City. The station is located at the intersection of Gun Hill Road and Webster Avenue.

History

Rail service in Williams Bridge can be traced as far back as 1842 with the establishment of the New York and Harlem Railroad, which became part of the New York Central and Hudson River Railroad in 1864 and eventually taken over by the New York Central Railroad. Williams Bridge Station itself, which was originally built sometime in the 19th century, originally had a station house on the southeast corner of the Gun Hill Road bridge and even had a turntable.

From 1920 through 1973, the 210th Street–Williamsbridge station of the elevated IRT Third Avenue Line was close to the Williams Bridge station. The Third Avenue Line used to curve from Webster Avenue over Gun Hill Road, then crossed over the Harlem Line tracks on a two-level bridge carrying Gun Hill Road and the Third Avenue El. The line terminated at Gun Hill Road station on the IRT White Plains Road Line, along White Plains Road to the east.

As with many NYCRR stations in the Bronx, the station became a Penn Central station once the NYC & Pennsylvania Railroads merged in 1968. Penn Central's continuous financial despair throughout the 1970s forced them to turn over their commuter service to the Metropolitan Transportation Authority. The station and the railroad were turned over to Conrail in 1976, and eventually became part of the MTA's Metro-North Railroad in 1983. Access to a parking lot on the site of the former station house was available from the southbound on-ramp of the Bronx River Parkway, which had two way traffic from Gun Hill Road to the parking lot until the 1990s, and was named Newell Street between those two points.

Station layout
The station has two offset high-level side platforms, each four cars long and accessible from East Gun Hill Road (East 210th Street). When trains stop at the station, normally the front four open cars receive and discharge passengers.

Bibliography

References

External links

 Gun Hill Road entrance from Google Maps Street View
 Grand Central Platform from Google Maps Street View
 Northbound Platform from Google Maps Street View

1842 establishments in New York (state)
Former New York Central Railroad stations
Metro-North Railroad stations in New York City
Railway stations in the Bronx
Railway stations in the United States opened in 1842
Williamsbridge, Bronx